Center Arbor is a historic Methodist tabernacle located at Center, Davie County, North Carolina. It was built in 1876, and is a large, open, rectangular timber-framed structure four bays wide and
eight bays deep.  It measures approximately 60 feet wide and 80 feet deep.  The tabernacle is associated with Center United Methodist Church and was the site of camp meeting revivals.

It was added to the National Register of Historic Places in 1991.

See also 

Balls Creek Campground
Ocean Grove Camp Meeting Association
Chapel Hill Church Tabernacle
Pleasant Grove Camp Meeting Ground

References

External links
Center Arbor - Center United Methodist Church

Churches on the National Register of Historic Places in North Carolina
Methodist churches in North Carolina
Churches completed in 1876
19th-century Methodist church buildings in the United States
Buildings and structures in Davie County, North Carolina
National Register of Historic Places in Davie County, North Carolina
Tabernacles (Methodist)
Methodism in North Carolina
United Methodist Church